Rana Ejaz Ahmad Noon is a Pakistani politician who was a Member of the Provincial Assembly of the Punjab, from 2002 to May 2018 and from August 2018 to January 2023.

Early life and education
He was born on 8 April 1968 in Multan.

He received his early education from Aitchison College and obtained a degree of Bachelor of Arts in 1989 from Government College University.

Political career
He was elected to the Provincial Assembly of the Punjab as a candidate of Pakistan Muslim League (Q) (PML-Q) from Constituency PP-204 (Multan-XI) in 2002 Pakistani general election. He received 31,498 votes and defeated Rafique Ahmad, a candidate of Pakistan Muslim League (N) (PML-N).

He was re-elected to the Provincial Assembly of the Punjab as a candidate of PML-Q from Constituency PP-204 (Multan-XI) in 2008 Pakistani general election. He received 32,704 votes and defeated Khurram Fareed Khan, a candidate of Pakistan Peoples Party.

He was re-elected to the Provincial Assembly of the Punjab as a candidate of PML-N from Constituency PP-204 (Multan-XI) in 2013 Pakistani general election.

In December 2013, he was appointed as Parliamentary Secretary for agriculture.

He was re-elected to Provincial Assembly of the Punjab as a candidate of PML-N from Constituency PP-221 (Multan-XI) in 2018 Pakistani general election.

References

Living people
Punjab MPAs 2013–2018
Punjab MPAs 2002–2007
Punjab MPAs 2008–2013
1968 births
Pakistan Muslim League (N) MPAs (Punjab)
Aitchison College alumni
Punjab MPAs 2018–2023